Lviv State School of Physical Culture is a sports college in Lviv.

The school was established in 1971 as a sports boarding school.

The school also includes a specialized boarding school.

See also
 National University of Physical Education and Sport of Ukraine

References

External links
 Official website

Universities and colleges in Lviv
Sport schools in Ukraine